The Angling Times first printed in 1953 is the UK's largest angling newspaper. They also publish Improve Your Coarse Fishing and UK Carp magazine.

Angling Times has advice from nationally known names in the sport, such as, Steve Ringer, Keith Arthur, John Wilson and Des Taylor.

The price of the publication is £2.50 and is available as a subscription on offer for £8.50 a month. Also available as iPad and Android version

The Go Fishing website has instruction, where to fish, videos and features.

References

External links 
 Angling Times

Recreational fishing in the United Kingdom
Sports magazines published in the United Kingdom
Bauer Group (UK)
1953 establishments in the United Kingdom
Magazines established in 1953
Hunting and fishing magazines